Robin Tadross (born August 8, 1980), professionally known as Rob Knox, is an American Grammy nominated record producer and songwriter. He is best known for working with artists including Justin Timberlake, Lil Wayne, T.I., Rihanna, Britney Spears and Chris Brown.  Knox has produced singles including "Dead and Gone" by T.I. and Justin Timberlake and "Love Sex Magic" by Ciara and Justin Timberlake.

Credits

Singles

Cites 
https://www.vevo.com/watch/nuvotv/DJ-Skee-deconstructs-Dead-and-Gone-with-Rob-Knox-(The-Collective-Powered-by-VEVO)/TIVEV1413564
http://www.grammyintheschools.com/features/real-rob-knox
http://ca.complex.com/music/2013/03/the-25-best-justin-timberlake-songs/justin-timberlake-dead-gone
http://popcrush.com/justin-timberlake-cast-characters-2020-experience
http://rollingout.com/2008/12/18/the-next-great-hitmaker-rob-knox-marches-to-the-beat-of-his-own-drum
http://istandardproducers.com/interviews/rk
http://www.blazetrak.com/professional?proid=106633
http://channeldynamic.com/rob-knox-music-producer-bio-discography
http://www.blazetrak.com/professional-bio?proid=10
http://thelosangelesbeat.com/2014/05/ascap-i-create-music-expo
http://www.billboard.com/articles/list/466094/king-back-tis-10-biggest-billboard-hits
http://www.billboard.com/artist/299324/ciara/chart?f=379

References 

American record producers
1980 births
Living people
Place of birth missing (living people)